The naval ensign (or war ensign) of the Republic of Poland is a swallowtailed horizontal bicolor of white and red with the national coat of arms in the middle of the white stripe. It has been used by the Polish Navy since 1919.

See also
List of Polish naval and maritime flags

References 
 
  Ustawa z dnia 19 lutego 1993 r. o znakach Sił Zbrojnych Rzeczypospolitej Polskiej (Insignia of the Polish Armed Forces Act of 19 February 1993), Dz.U. z 1993 r. Nr 34, poz. 154

Poland
National symbols of Poland
Flags displaying animals